"Hand In Hand" is a song by American rapper and producer DJ Quik, released as the second single from his fourth studio album Rhythm-al-ism (1998). The song features additional vocals from fellow rap duo 2nd II None and American singer El Debarge.

In the song, DJ Quik momentarily pays homage to the Almond Joy jingle "Sometimes You Feel Like a Nut", written by Leo Corday and Leon Carr.

Track listings
CD single
"Hand In Hand" (Radio Mix) (featuring 2nd II None & El DeBarge) – 4:20
"Hand In Hand" (Instrumental) – 4:20
"Hand In Hand" (Call Out Research Hook) – 0:10

Music video
The music video has cameos of actresses Nadine Velazquez and Shannyn Sossamon.

Charts

References

1998 singles
Arista Records singles
2nd II None songs
DJ Quik songs
Song recordings produced by DJ Quik
Songs written by El DeBarge
Songs written by DJ Quik